The Hindenburg Range is a mountain range in the remote North Fly District of the Western Province of Papua New Guinea, stretching from the Star Mountains to the east. The Hindenburg Wall escarpment leads up to the range.

References 

Mountain ranges of Papua New Guinea